Pig is a 2010 horror film directed by Adam Mason starring Molly Black, Guy Burnet and Andrew Howard.

Plot
A deranged man finds one of his escaped victims, where he recaptures her and murders her. He brings the remains back to his junk-filled camp in the desert. Another woman (played by Lorry O'Toole) is seen chained up and abused. Andrew Howard's character urinates, abuses, and brings this character to his self-named “Rape Pen”. A mentally handicapped woman (played by Molly Black) is referred to as "baby". She is pregnant, with what is assumed as Andrew Howard's baby, and kept locked in a cage. His third victim, played by Guy Burnett, is also chained up, until he is released and used by Molly Black and Andrew Howard for target practice. The pair then perform abhorrent acts upon his dead body with Andrew saying, "I've never stuck a screwdriver up someone's ass before." The dead woman from earlier (Lorry O'Toole) is seen gutted and her liver is cooked over a fire. The film ends with Andrew Howard putting on a suit and leaving on a plane to a supposed job in Hollywood.

Production
Pig was made with a budget of $3,000 and the whole 80 minutes of the movie is shot in one continuous shot that follows the main character, played by Andrew Howard, as he tortures and kills. The entire film was also improvised, since no script was written. The four credited producers for the movie are Adam Mason, Andrew Howard, Patrick Ewald, Michael J. Sarna.

The film was also never made to be sold. It has been streamed on platforms like SXSW and BloodyDisgusting, with only a few copies of the film being sold.

Reception
With the brutal nature and raw camera, this movie was never meant to be commercial friendly. Reviews for Pig include: "One of the single most grueling movie watching experiences you are ever likely to have," wrote Steve Barton from DREAD CENTRAL. "Howard's performance is mesmerizing. Proceed with caution. You have been warned," a writer from horrornews.net wrote. Twtitchfilm.net calls it, "Gory. Sadistic. Unflinching.".

Cast
 Molly Black	
 Guy Burnet
 Andrew Howard
 Lorry O'Toole
 Juliet Quintin-Archard

References

External links
 

2010 horror films
2010 films
One-shot films
2010s English-language films
Films directed by Adam Mason